The plateau vole (Lasiopodomys fuscus) is a species of rodent in the family Cricetidae.
It is found only in China.
Its natural habitat is temperate grassland.

References

Musser, G. G. and M. D. Carleton. 2005. Superfamily Muroidea. pp. 894–1531 in Mammal Species of the World a Taxonomic and Geographic Reference. D. E. Wilson and D. M. Reeder eds. Johns Hopkins University Press, Baltimore.

Lasiopodomys
Endemic fauna of China
Mammals described in 1889
Taxonomy articles created by Polbot